Leptocypris guineensis is a species of cyprinid fish found in Atlantic slope drainages of the Guinean mountain ranges.

References

Leptocypris
Danios
Freshwater fish of West Africa
Fish described in 1962